The Sunda forktail (Enicurus velatus) is a species of bird in the family Muscicapidae. It is endemic to Indonesia, where it is restricted to the islands of Java and Sumatra. Its natural habitat is boulder strewn streams in tropical moist montane forest from 600–2000 m. More rarely the species occurs closer to sea level. The species is common in Sumatra, but is rarer in Java, where the white-crowned forktail is more common.

The Sunda forktail is  n length with a deeply forked tail. The male has a white breast, belly and rump, and black wings, and a dark grey back and head. There is a small white line between the eyes. The tail is black with white barring. The female is similar to the male but has a brown crown and nape. There are two subspecies described, the nominate race occurring on Java. The Sumatran subspecies, sumatranus, differs from the nominate in having more rufous brown on the female. The call of his species is a hard shrill "chee" or "hie-tie-tie"

The Sunda forktail feeds on aquatic insects and their larvae, as well as snails. The nest of this species is a large cup of woven mosses, grasses leaves and wood fibres. Two whitish with red spotting eggs are a laid.

References

Sunda forktail
Birds of Sumatra
Birds of Java
Sunda forktail
Taxonomy articles created by Polbot